These are the results for the mixed BMX racing event at the 2018 Summer Youth Olympics.

Results

Boys

Semifinals

Heat 1

Heat 2

Final

Girls

Semifinals

Heat 1

Heat 2

Final

Overall

References
 Overall Results
 Boys Semifinals results 
 Girls Semifinals results 
 Boys Results 
 Girls Results 

Cycling at the 2018 Summer Youth Olympics